Luis Manuel B. Locsin (born October 19, 1971), better known as Noli Locsin, is a Filipino retired professional basketball player. Dubbed as "The Tank", He is best known for his playing years with the Ginebra San Miguel franchise in the Philippine Basketball Association.

Playing career
Locsin played for the RP Youth team in 1990 before suiting up for back-to-back UAAP titlist De La Salle Green Archers. He had a brief stint with Triple-V Foodmasters in the Philippine Basketball League prior to its disbandment and then played for Nikon Electric Fan which completed a cinderella finish in the PBL.

When 6-9 Marlou Aquino, the most sought-after rookie, was out of the picture in the 1994 PBA draft, Ginebra, now renamed Tondeña 65, and the team that will pick first in the amateur draft, went for the next best option in Noli Locsin, a burly 6-3 power forward who can barrel his way into the toughest walls of the defenders.

He showed the Tondeña ballclub that it made the right choice when he emerged as the team's leading scorer and the league's leading local rebounder with his rookie season averages of 18.5 points, 8.8 rebounds, 2.9 assists in 34.9 minutes. His stats are not enough through as Tondeña's struggles continued, winning just 12 of their 32 games in the 1994 season.

Playing for player-coach Robert Jaworski's "never-say-die" system, he flourished playing power forward while being undersized at only 6-3 without being able to develop outside shooting. A consistent low post threat, Locsin closed the size gap with his strength and skill although he began to fade out as soon as he parted ways with Jaworski. Before the arrival of Fil-Ams in the PBA, Locsin was considered one of the top bruisers of his time in a time when it was rare for a Filipino player with his bulk to move as quick and leap as he did. Locsin was then traded to Pop Cola in the mid-season in 1999 for Vergel Meneses. He drifted to other PBA teams such as Tanduay and Red Bull before retiring.

References

External links
 Player Profile at PBA-Online!

1971 births
Living people
Barako Bull Energy Boosters players
Barangay Ginebra San Miguel players
Filipino men's basketball players
Philippine Basketball Association All-Stars
Place of birth missing (living people)
Pop Cola Panthers players
Power forwards (basketball)
Small forwards
Sportspeople from Negros Occidental
Sta. Lucia Realtors players
Tanduay Rhum Masters players
TNT Tropang Giga players
De La Salle Green Archers basketball players
Doping cases in basketball
Barangay Ginebra San Miguel draft picks